Stathis Gourgouris is a poet, essayist, translator, sound artist, and professor of Classics, English, Comparative Literature at Columbia University. He also writes opinion pieces on contemporary politics and culture in newspapers and internet media in both Greek and English. He is the recipient of a Guggenheim Fellowship in 2022. He was also a former president of the Modern Greek Studies Association (2006-2012) and director of the Institute for Comparative Literature and Society at Columbia (2009-2015). He is a member of the Sublamental Artists Collective, which releases his music and sound art compositions under the name Count G.

Biography 
Gourgouris earned his B.A., M.A., and Ph.D., all from the University of California, Los Angeles. He taught at Princeton University from 1992 to 2000, Columbia University from 2002 to 2005, University of California, Los Angeles from 2005 to 2008, before rejoining Columbia's faculty in 2008. He was also a visiting professor at the National Technical University of Athens.

Gourgouris' writings focus on the intersection between the poetics and politics of modernity and democracy. He has written extensively on Ancient Greek philosophy, political theory, and contemporary Greek culture and politics.

References 

Living people
University of California, Los Angeles alumni
Columbia University faculty
Princeton University faculty
University of California, Los Angeles faculty
Academic staff of the National Technical University of Athens
American scholars of ancient Greek philosophy
American classical scholars
Comparative literature academics
Year of birth missing (living people)
American people of Greek descent